Siegfried & Roy were a duo of German-American magicians and entertainers, best known for their appearances with white lions and white tigers. It was composed of Siegfried Fischbacher (June 13, 1939 – January 13, 2021) and Roy Horn (born Uwe Ludwig Horn; October 3, 1944 – May 8, 2020).

From February 1, 1990, until Horn's career-ending injury on his birthday on October 3, 2003, the duo formed Siegfried & Roy at the Mirage Resort and Casino, which was regarded as the most-visited show in Las Vegas, Nevada. From August 2004 to May 2005, Fischbacher and Horn were executive producers of the animated sitcom Father of the Pride.

Early life
Fischbacher and Horn were born and raised in Germany. They moved to the United States and became naturalized citizens in 1988.

Siegfried
Siegfried Fischbacher was born in Rosenheim, Bavaria, Germany, on June 13, 1939, to Martin and Maria Fischbacher. His mother was a housewife, and his father a professional painter who during World War II ended up as a prisoner of war in the Soviet Union. Fischbacher purchased a book about magic tricks as a child and began to practice illusions. He moved to Italy in 1956 and started work at a hotel.

Eventually, Fischbacher found work performing magic on the ship TS Bremen under the stage name Delmare. While performing aboard the ship, he met Horn and asked him to assist him during a show. Fischbacher and Horn were fired from the TS Bremen for bringing a live cheetah onto the ship, but were scouted by a cruise line based in New York and began performing together as a duo.

Roy
Roy was born Uwe Ludwig Horn on October 3, 1944, in Nordenham, Oldenburg, Germany, in the midst of bomb attacks, to Johanna Horn. His father died in World War II, and his mother married a construction worker after the war ended. She later began work in a factory. Horn had three brothers: Manfred, Alfred, and Werner. Horn became interested in animals at a very young age and cared for his childhood dog named Hexe (witch). A family friend was the founder of Bremen Zoo, which gave Horn access to exotic animals from the age of 10. Horn left school at age 13.  He worked as a waiter on the cruise ship Bremen, where he met Fischbacher and launched his performance career.

Career
The owner of the Astoria Theatre in Bremen saw Fischbacher and Horn's act aboard a Caribbean cruise ship and recruited the duo to perform at her nightclub. This launched a career for the pair on the European nightclub circuit, and they began to perform with tigers. They were discovered performing in Paris by Tony Azzie, who asked them to come to Las Vegas in 1967. They spent some time in Puerto Rico and may have purchased property there.

In 1981, Ken Feld of Irvin & Kenneth Feld Productions started the Beyond Belief show with them at the New Frontier Hotel and Casino. A revamped version of the show was taken on a world tour in the third quarter of 1988.

During a period of their careers, Fischbacher and Horn were romantically involved, though they avoided discussion of their private lives.

Vegas 1967, they debuted in the Folies Bergere at The Tropicana Hotel Las Vegas.

2003 tiger incident
During a show at the Mirage on Horn's birthday on October 3, 2003, a seven-year-old white tiger named Mantacore attacked Horn. (The name of the tiger has frequently been misspelled as "Montecore" in media reports.) As part of the act, but veering off script, Horn held his microphone to Mantacore's mouth and told him to say "hello" to the audience. Mantacore responded by biting Horn's sleeve. Horn swatted the tiger and barked "release!", while standby trainers unsuccessfully attempted to distract the cat with cubes of meat. Possibly incited by Horn's retreat, the tiger leapt at Horn, swinging at his legs and knocking him off his feet.

As trainers rushed in from offstage to assist, Mantacore bit into Horn's neck and dragged him offstage. Trainers got the tiger to release Horn by spraying him with CO2 fire extinguisher canisters, the last resort available.

The attack severed Horn's spine, resulted in massive blood loss, and severely injured other parts of his body, permanently impairing his motor and verbal abilities. He also had a stroke either before or after Mantacore dragged him offstage.

While being taken to the hospital, Horn stated, "Mantacore is a great cat. Make sure no harm comes to Mantacore." He told People in September 2004 that Mantacore saved his life by trying to drag him to safety after he had a stroke. The incident prompted the Mirage to close the show, which had 267 cast and crew members.

Trainer Chris Lawrence later contradicted Fischbacher and Horn's explanations for why the tiger attacked Horn, alleging it was due to Horn's mishandling of Mantacore. The duo dismissed Lawrence's claims, stating he "had problems with his life anyway". Lawrence later said he believed that the duo and the Mirage covered up the real reason for the attack in order to protect their image.

Aftermath and retirement

In August 2004, their act became the basis for Father of the Pride. Right before its release, the series was almost cancelled until Fischbacher and Horn urged NBC to continue production after Horn's condition improved following the attack by Mantacore in October 2003. By March 2006, Horn was talking and walking, with assistance from Fischbacher, and appeared on Pat O'Brien's television news program The Insider to discuss his daily rehabilitation.

In February 2009, the duo staged a final appearance with Mantacore as a benefit for the Lou Ruvo Brain Institute (though Chris Lawrence had stated this performance involved a different tiger). Their performance was recorded for broadcast on ABC television's 20/20 program.

On April 23, 2010, Fischbacher and Horn retired from show business. "The last time we closed, we didn't have a lot of warning", said longtime manager Bernie Yuman. "This is farewell. This is the dot at the end of the sentence."

On March 19, 2014, Mantacore died after a brief illness. He was 17 years old.

In June 2016, director Philipp Stölzl announced that Fischbacher and Horn would produce a biopic film documenting their lives.

Horn's illness and death
On April 28, 2020, Horn's publicist stated that he "tested positive for the virus that causes COVID-19 and is currently responding well to treatment".  However, his condition deteriorated, and he died on May 8, 2020, at the age of 75 at Mountain View Hospital in Las Vegas during the COVID-19 pandemic in Nevada. The duo's spokesman, Dave Kirvin, announced Horn's death and said it was due to complications from the disease. Fischbacher stated that "the world has lost one of the greats of magic, but I have lost my best friend".

Fischbacher's death
On January 11, 2021, Fischbacher announced he had terminal pancreatic cancer. He died in Las Vegas two days later, on January 13, 2021, at the age of 81.

Filmography

 Siegfried & Roy: Masters of the Impossible (1996)
 Vegas Vacation (1997)
 Siegfried & Roy: The Magic Box (1999)
 Ocean's Eleven (2001) as Boxing Spectator
 Showboy (2002)

Television
Father of the Pride (2004–2005, TV series)
Siegfried & Roy: The Magic Returns (March 6, 2009)

See also
King Charles Troupe, entertainers that performed with Siegfried & Roy

References

External links

  (archived)
 

Felidae attacks
Las Vegas shows
Magician duos
Naturalized citizens of the United States
Deaths from the COVID-19 pandemic in the United States
Academy of Magical Arts Masters Fellowship winners
LGBT magicians
Deaths from pancreatic cancer